is a Japanese horticulturalist and professor of the Human Environmental Science Department at Keisen University. He appears as a gardening tipster on the NHK TV show , which entered its 5th season in 2012.

He is an alumnus of the graduate school at Iwate University.

Selected bibliography

References

1959 births
People from Akita Prefecture
Japanese gardeners
Academic staff of Keisen University
Living people